Church Clothes 4 is a 2022 mixtape from Christian hip hop artist Lecrae, released on November 4 through his own label Reach Records. It constitutes the final installment of his Church Clothes mixtape series begun in 2012. It includes featured appearances from Andy Mineo, PJ Morton, A.I. the Anomaly, Jon Keith, nobigdyl., WHATUPRG, and Jordan L’Oreal. Two singles were released from the mixtape — "Spread the Opps", on August 5, 2022, and "Fear Not", on October 26, 2022.

Background and recording 
Lecrae released the first installment of his mixtape series, Church Clothes, in the summer of 2012. Hosted by DJ Don Cannon, it was intended to exemplify Lecrae's authenticity to both hip hop and his Christian faith. Within 48 hours of its release for free on Datpiff.com, the mixtape was downloaded over 100,000 times. Two more mixtapes followed in subsequent years: Church Clothes 2 in 2013 and Church Clothes 3 in 2016. Lecrae's tenth studio album, Restoration (2020), was announced to be possibly his last studio endeavor, but Lecrae held out the possibility of future mixtapes. He told Rapzilla in 2020 that “...I'll probably do some mixtapes, but I don't know if I'm making another full-featured album. It's a younger generation right now man, so you know, I feel like I may give them another Church Clothes and close a chapter out." In 2021, he and labelmate 1K Phew released the collaborative album No Church in a While. In January 2022, he announced Church Clothes 4. On August 4, 2022, a press release from Reach Records stated that Church Clothes 4 was forthcoming and that it would close out the Church Clothes series. "We did Vol 1, 2, and 3, only right that we keep the legacy with Vol.4. Church Clothes 4 is the last one though!" On September 29, 2022, Lecrae stated in an interview that the previously hinted at J. Cole feature did not materialize.

Release 
Two singles preceded the mixtape's release. "Spread the Opps", produced by DrumGod, JuanRa, Simbo, and DudeClayy, was released on August 5, 2022. It was accompanied by a music video directed by Ray Neutron. A second single, "Fear Not", was released on October 26, 2022, and was produced by Lecrae, Juberlee, Cubeatz, and Vinnyforgood. Church Clothes 4 was released on November 4, 2022, on digital platforms and for CD pre-order. A music video for the song "Still in America", directed by Isaac Dietz, from the album was released on the same day.

Content and style 
Preezy Brown from Vibe noted Lecrae's lyricism, apparent immediately on the first track, "CC4", and contemplative and uplifting moments of thought. A major theme of the mixtape is Lecrae's faith deconstruction and coming to accept himself. Another is the need for healing and for people to work together. "Spread the Opps", according to Lecrae, is about him being rejected by others but still holding his own. On "Still in America", Lecrae tried to explore the nuance and diversity of experiences of Americans and try to find unity through common ground. "Take Me Up" includes a sample from the group Bone Thugs-n-Harmony. Lecrae stated in an interview with Holy Culture that after the first Church Clothes mixtape came out, Krayzie Bone sought him out for conversation. "Fear Not" follows Lecrae's journey from sin to salvation. Ken Partridge from Genius noted that the song's music and lyrics have a "chilly horror-movie vibe" that were perfect for late October. The chorus references Halloween and Partridge considered the first verse, which ends with Lecrae resigned to an early death, to be "pure psychological horror". The direct quotes of the Psalm are in Portuguese and Yoruba. The song also references Lecrae's pressuring of a then-girlfriend into getting an abortion. On the final song, "Deconstruction", Lecrae recounts his deconstruction and reconstruction, which was triggered just before the fall of 2015. After Lecrae tweeted about the killing of Michael Brown, he encountered backlash from many Christians online and was further hurt by the response he received from pastor Voddie Baucham. Lecrae fell into clinical depression. As he worked through his church trauma, he came to the conclusion that Western society has twisted the teachings of Christianity and so he reconstructed his faith with a more Eastern context instead. Lecrae said in his interview with Holy Culture that this song was one of four that he feels he was prompted by God to write.

Critical reception 

Matt Baldwin of Jesus Freak Hideout rated the mixtape four stars out of five, describing it as an "autobiographical telling of his deconstruction journey that ultimately lead to his reconstruction and strengthening of his faith... [shining] like a beacon for those walking through the valley of the shadow of death".

Track list

Credits 

 Lecrae Moore - primary artist, production on "Fear Not"
 Tori Palmatier - executive producer
 Kevin Hackett - artwork
 Ray Neutron - artwork
 nobigdyl. - featured artist on "Misconceptions 4"
 Jon Keith - featured artist on "Misconceptions 4"
 A.I. The Anomaly - featured artist on "Misconceptions 4"
 Tedashii - additional vocals on "I-45 Freestyle"
 Andy Mineo - featured artist and production on "Good Lord"
 WHATUPRG - featured artist on "Take Me Up"
 Jordan L'Oreal - featured artist on "Protect My Peace", additional writing on "We Did It"
 PJ Morton - featured artist on "We Did It"
 Juberlee - production on "CC4", "Dirt", and "Fear Not"
 Ace Harris - production on "CC4", "Take Me Up", "Protect My Peace", and "Deconstruction", additional writing on "Spread the Opps" and "Good Lord"
 Connor Back - production on "CC4"
 theBeatbreaker - production on "CC4", "Still in America", "I-45 Freestyle", "Take Me Up", "Protect My Peace", "Journey", and "Deconstruction"
 DrumGod - production on "Spread the Opps"
 Dude Clayy - production on "Spread the Opps"
 Simbo - production on "Spread the Opps"
 JuanRa - production on "Spread the Opps"
 Sims Cashion - production on "Dirt"
 Jaden Eli - production on "Dirt"
 WEARETHEGOOD - production on "Still in America"
 Slikk Muzik - production on "Misconceptions 4" and "We Did It"
 Alex Goose - production on "Good Lord"
 Matt Zara - production on "Good Lord"
 Dylan Hyde - production on "I-45 Freestyle"
 Leslie Johnson - production on "I-45 Freestyle"
 Curious George - production on "I-45 Freestyle"
 Joel McNeill - production on "Take Me Up" and "Deconstruction"
 Carvello - production on "Take Me Up"
 Lil' Ronnie - production on "Protect My Peace"
 CuBeatz - production on "Fear Not"
 Vinnyforgood - production on "Fear Not"
 Luis Bacqué - production on "Fear Not"
 KelbyOnTheTrack - production on "We Did It"
 Lyle Leduff - production on "Journey"
 Don Cannon - production on "Journey"
 NIQ Maximus - production on "Journey"
 Andrew Prim - production on "Deconstruction"
 Alexandria Dollar - writing on "CC4", "Spread the Opps", "Dirt", "Misconceptions 4", and "We Did It"
 Oddisee - writing on "CC4"
 Deandre Hunter - writing on "Spread the Opps", "Protect My Peace", and "We Did It"
 Jakob Zimmerman - writing on "Misconceptions 4"
 Montell Jordan - writing on "Misconceptions 4"
 Harold Allen - writing on "Journey"
 Ryan Plumley - orchestration on "CC4", "Still in America", "I-45 Freestyle", "Take Me Up", "Protect My Peace", "Journey", and "Deconstruction"
 Todd Simon - orchestration on "Good Lord"
 Matt Zara - orchestration on "Good Lord"
 Paul Spring - orchestration on "Good Lord"
 Joe Harrison - orchestration on "Good Lord"
 Natarsha Garcia - choir conductor on "Spread the Opps"
 Brandin Jay - choir conductor on "Spread the Opps"
 Jacob “Biz” Morris  - studio personnel on "Spread the Opps"
 Connor Back - studio personnel on "Spread the Opps"

Charts

References 

Lecrae albums
2022 mixtape albums
Reach Records albums
Albums produced by Lecrae
Albums produced by Don Cannon
Albums produced by Andy Mineo
Albums produced by Lil' Ronnie
Albums produced by Cubeatz